Schwippe  is a river of Baden-Württemberg, Germany. Along the river are the towns of Dagersheim, Darmsheim and Grafenau. Smaller rivers flowing into the Schwippe include the Goldbach, Murken Bach, Aischbach, Hulbgraben and Buchentalgraben.

See also
List of rivers of Baden-Württemberg

References

Rivers of Baden-Württemberg
Rivers of Germany